eSignal, a Windows-based application, uses JavaScript as the basis for the scripting language that programmers and traders can use for building custom indicators. This, in effect, includes eSignal users in the base from which to draw programmers for writing indicators.

Advertisement for the company
eSignal provides streaming, real-time market data, news and analytics. The other products offered under the eSignal brand include eSignal, Advanced GET, eSignal OnDemand,

eSignal, Advanced GET, couples eSignal's market data, back testing and trading strategy tools with a proprietary set of indicators, including the Elliott Oscillator, eXpert Trend Locator and False Bar Stochastic. Its rules-based set-ups include the signature Advanced GET Type 1 and 2 trades.

References

Footnotes

Sources

January 2015 S&C magazine review of eSignal 12.0
eSignal Mobile launches a brand new application specially designed for the iPad
Interactive Data Announces eSignal 12.0 -- Latest Version of Leading Trading Software
eSignal 12 tried and tested
Interactive Data Announces Latest Release of eSignal Now Available

External links 
 

Technical analysis software
Financial data vendors
Financial software
Market data
 Technical Analysis